Table tennis competitions at the 2011 Pan American Games in Guadalajara were held from October 15 to October 20 at the CODE Dome.

A total of eighty players, forty each of male and female players, participated at the table tennis event. In the individual event, players competed in round robin groups to determine the teams advancing to the eighth-finals. In the doubles event, twelve teams of three played four singles and one doubles match against other teams in a round robin to determine the four teams advancing to the semifinals.

Singles matches were played as best-of-seven games; the players played each game until one player scores at least eleven points and wins by at least two points. Team matches will be different in that they will be best-of-five games instead of best of seven games.

The winners of each singles event will qualify to compete at the 2012 Summer Olympics in London, Great Britain.

Medal summary

Medal table

Events

Schedule
All times are Central Daylight time (UTC-5).

Qualification

Each NOC can enter a maximum of six athleted (3 male and 3 female). Mexico as host nations and twelve other nations through qualification tournaments can enter a full team for the respective gender. The other four spots per gender will be decided on an athlete basis, not country.

References

 
Events at the 2011 Pan American Games
Pan American Games
2011
2011 Pan American Games